Targovishte Municipality is a municipality (obshtina) in Targovishte Province, Northeastern Bulgaria, located in the transition between the Danubian Plain and the area of the so-called Fore-Balkan. It is named after its administrative centre - the city of Targovishte which is also the capital of the province.

The Hemus motorway is planned to cross the area north of the main city.

Settlements 

(towns are shown in bold):
Population (December 2009)

 Targovishte - Търговище - 37,375
 Alvanovo - Алваново - 182
 Aleksandrovo - Александрово - 252
 Bayachevo - Баячево - 860
 Bistra - Бистра - 202
 Bozhurka - Божурка - 301
 Bratovo - Братово - 207
 Buynovo - Буйново - 665
 Buhovtsi - Буховци - 640
 Cherkovna - Черковна - 671
 Davidovo - Давидово - 461
 Draganovets - Драгановец - 507
 Dralfa - Дралфа - 617
 Dalgach - Дългач - 518
 Golyamo Novo - Голямо Ново - 1,241
 Golyamo Sokolovo - Голямо Соколово - 475
 Gorna Kabda - Горна Кабда - 69
 Koprets - Копрец - 244
 Koshnichari - Кошничари - 86
 Kralevo - Кралево - 975
 Krashno - Кръшно - 257
 Lilyak - Лиляк - 1,167
 Lovets - Ловец - 472
 Makariopolsko - Макариополско - 728
 Makovo - Маково - 298
 Miladinovtsi - Миладиновци - 228
 Mirovets - Мировец - 125
 Momino - Момино - 285
 Nadarevo - Надарево - 509
 Ovcharovo - Овчарово - 682
 Osen - Осен - 72
 Ostrets - Острец - 428
 Paydushko - Пайдушко - 239
 Pevets - Певец - 176
 Podgoritsa - Подгорица - 988
 Preselets - Преселец - 377
 Presiyan - Пресиян - 233
 Presyak - Пресяк - 212
 Probuda - Пробуда - 571
 Prolaz - Пролаз - 99
 Razboyna - Разбойна - 465
 Ralitsa - Ралица - 292
 Rosina - Росина - 336
 Ruets - Руец - 1,077
 Strazha - Стража - 771
 Saedinenie - Съединение - 367
 Tvardintsi - Твърдинци - 160
 Tarnovtsa - Търновца - 347
 Tsvetnitsa - Цветница - 103
 Vardun - Вардун - 1,013
 Vasil Levski - Васил Левски - 370
 Zdravets - Здравец - 502

Demography 

The following table shows the change of the population during the last four decades. Since 1992 Targovishte Municipality has comprised the former municipalities of Dralfa and Makariopolsko and the numbers in the table reflect this unification.

Ethnic composition
According to the 2011 census, among those who answered the optional question on ethnic identification, the ethnic composition of the municipality was the following:

Religious composition
The religious composition, among those who answered the optional question on religious identification, according to the 2011 census, was the following: 58,8% is a member of the Bulgarian Orthodox Church, which makes Bulgarian Orthodox Christians the largest religious group in the municipality. The second largest religious group, with 30,1% of the total population, is the Muslim minority (Islam in Bulgaria). Around 7,5% preferred not to answer and a further 2,8% had no religion.

See also

Provinces of Bulgaria
Municipalities of Bulgaria
List of cities and towns in Bulgaria

References

External links
 Official website 

Municipalities in Targovishte Province